Meemannavis (meaning "Meemann’s bird") is a genus of ornithuromorph bird from the Early Cretaceous (Aptian) Xiagou Formation of Gansu Province, China. The genus contains a single species, Meemannavis ductrix, known from a partial skeleton including an incomplete skull and cervical and thoracic vertebrae. The lower jaw and tip of the upper jaw of the Meemannavis holotype are toothless, but it may have had teeth nearer the back of the upper jaw.

Naming 
The generic name, "Meemannavis," combines a reference to Meemann Chang, a Chinese paleontologist, with the Latin "avis," meaning "bird." The specific name, "ductrix," is derived from the Latin "ductor," meaning "leader," in reference to Chang's position as the first female director of the IVPP.

References 

Birds described in 2021
Fossil taxa described in 2021
Extinct birds of Asia
Early Cretaceous dinosaurs of Asia
Prehistoric bird genera
Prehistoric euornitheans